Ephraim Bee (December 26, 1802 – October 23, 1888) was an American pioneer, blacksmith, and inn-keeper of Doddridge County, West Virginia, which he represented in the West Virginia House of Delegates in 1863 and 1866–1867.

Biography
Bee was born to Asa and Rhoda (Cox) Bee in Salem, New Jersey. He moved with his parents around 1820 to western Virginia, settling in what later became Lewisport. There he built his own cabin and blacksmith shop. He later operated a prosperous inn which he christened the "Beehive Inn". Bee was married twice: first to Catherine Davis (1803–1852) in 1823, and second to Mary Welch (1823–1905). Between them he had 17 children who survived infancy.

Bee is credited as the founder (1845) of E Clampus Vitus, a mostly facetious fraternal organization now dedicated to the preservation of western lore.

When West Virginia became a state in 1863 Bee represented Doddridge County in the first state legislature. In 1864–65 he served as the U.S. Postmaster for West Union. He was elected to two later terms in the House of Delegates before his retirement.

In his later years Bee was also a successful land speculator, acquiring around 40,000 acres (160 km²) in West Virginia. An item in the West Union Record in 1885 stated that "Honorable Ephraim Bee, one of the first settlers in this area & now an old & respected citizen of this county is dangerously ill at his home on Cabin Run." He died on October 23, 1888, age 86, and was buried in Cabin Run Cemetery, near West Union, West Virginia.

Legacy
Bee's grandson, Clair Bee (1896–1983), was a college basketball coach for Long Island University and, ultimately, a member of the Basketball Hall of Fame.

References

External links 
 Ephraim Bee – Early Settler of Doddridge County, W. VA
 Web Site honoring Bee, his West Virginia Vipers and Doddrige County

1802 births
1888 deaths
People from West Union, West Virginia
Members of the West Virginia House of Delegates
People from Salem, New Jersey
19th-century American politicians